Brahmina is a large Holarctic genus of scarab beetles in the tribe Melolonthini, containing over 90 species in three subgenera.

Species

Brahmina abdominalis (Brenske, 1903)
Brahmina abscessa Brenske, 1892
Brahmina adaequata Moser, 1909
Brahmina agnella (Faldermann, 1835)
Brahmina amurensis Brenske, 1892
Brahmina assamensis Moser, 1913
Brahmina bengalensis Nonfried, 1891
Brahmina braeti Brenske, 1896
Brahmina brevipilosa Moser, 1918
Brahmina brunneosparsa Arrow, 1946
Brahmina buruensis Brenske, 1892
Brahmina callosifrons Moser, 1913
Brahmina canaliculata (Fairmaire, 1897)
Brahmina cardoni Brenske, 1892
Brahmina cariniclypea Nomura, 1977
Brahmina carinifrons (Moser, 1909)
Brahmina ciliaticollis Moser, 1914
Brahmina comata Blanchard, 1851
Brahmina coriacea (Hope, 1831)
Brahmina crenicollis (Motschulsky, 1854) 
Brahmina cribriceps Moser, 1915
Brahmina cribricollis (Redtenbacher, 1844)
Brahmina crinicollis Burmeister, 1855
Brahmina cuprea Mittal & Pajni, 1977
Brahmina cylindrica (Gyllenhal, 1817)
Brahmina darcisi Reitter, 1902
Brahmina doeberli Keith, 2012
Brahmina dubitabilis (Fairmaire, 1891)
Brahmina elongata Moser, 1913
Brahmina excisiceps Moser, 1915
Brahmina extraria Keith, 2009
Brahmina faldermanni Kraatz, 1892
Brahmina flabellata Brenske, 1892
Brahmina flavipennis Moser, 1913
Brahmina glabellus (Nikolajev & Kabakov, 1980)
Brahmina hindu Keith, 2006
Brahmina itohi Kobayashi, 2000
Brahmina jubata Frey, 1969
Brahmina kabakovi (Nikolajev, 1976)
Brahmina kurseongana Moser, 1924
Brahmina latericostata (Fairmaire, 1888)
Brahmina lutea Moser, 1913
Brahmina macrophylla Moser, 1913
Brahmina malaccensis (Kirsch, 1875)
Brahmina mandarina Reitter, 1902
Brahmina microphylla Brenske, 1892
Brahmina mikado Itoh, 1996
Brahmina miyako Itoh, 1996
Brahmina moluccana Moser, 1909
Brahmina monticola Kobayashi, 1993
Brahmina moseri (Saylor, 1937)
Brahmina mysoreensis Frey, 1971
Brahmina nomurai Itoh, 1989
Brahmina nuda Moser, 1915
Brahmina parvula Moser, 1915
Brahmina perakensis Moser, 1913
Brahmina phytaloides Brenske, 1892
Brahmina pilifrons Moser, 1913
Brahmina plagiatula Brenske, 1896
Brahmina potanini (Semenov, 1891)
Brahmina pseudobrunneosparsa Keith, 2008
Brahmina pseudoglabella Keith, 2008
Brahmina pubiventris (Burmeister, 1855)
Brahmina pulchella (Motschulsky, 1853)
Brahmina pumila (Sharp, 1881)
Brahmina quasibrunneosparsa Keith, 2008
Brahmina rubetra (Faldermann, 1835)
Brahmina ruficollis Moser, 1915
Brahmina rugifrons Moser, 1918
Brahmina rugosicollis Frey, 1971
Brahmina ruida Zhang & Wang, 1997
Brahmina sakishimana Nomura, 1965
Brahmina sculpticollis Frey, 1969
Brahmina sedakovi (Mannerheim, 1849)
Brahmina senescens (Frivaldszky, 1890)
Brahmina serricollis (Motschulsky, 1853)
Brahmina shibatai Kobayashi, 1987
Brahmina shillongensis Brenske, 1899
Brahmina siamensis Brenske, 1892
Brahmina simlana Moser, 1913
Brahmina simplex Frey, 1972
Brahmina sophropoides Arrow, 1946
Brahmina soror Arrow, 1946
Brahmina subsericea (Moser, 1908)
Brahmina sulcifrons Moser, 1913
Brahmina sumatrensis Brenske, 1892
Brahmina taitungensis Nomura, 1977
Brahmina tavoyensis Brenske, 1892
Brahmina turcestana Brenske, 1892
Brahmina wutaiensis Zhang & Wang, 1997
Brahmina yunnana Moser, 1915

References

Melolonthinae
Scarabaeidae genera